William Franklin Salkeld (March 8, 1917 – April 22, 1967) was an American professional baseball player, a catcher in the Major Leagues from –50 for the Pittsburgh Pirates, Boston Braves and Chicago White Sox.

Early years
Salkeld's professional career was almost ended at the age of 19 by a serious knee injury that caused him to miss  seasons. He was able to return to baseball as the 22-year-old player-manager of the 1939 Tucson Cowboys of the Class D Arizona–Texas League. He then spent 1940–44 in the top-level Pacific Coast League.

Major league career
Salkeld made his Major League debut at age 28 with the 1945 Pirates during the final year of the World War II manpower shortage. As a rookie, Salkeld batted .311 with 15 home runs in only 317 plate appearances and finished 24th in the National League Most Valuable Player voting.  Although his productivity declined during the postwar period as ex-Major Leaguers returned to the game from military service, Salkeld kept his Major League foothold for most of the next four seasons.

Traded to the Boston Braves after the  campaign, Salkeld platooned with right-handed hitter Phil Masi in 1948 as the Braves stormed to their first National League championship in 34 years. Salkeld then appeared in five games of the 1948 World Series against the Cleveland Indians. In 15 plate appearances, he collected two hits and five walks plus one sacrifice hit for an on-base percentage of .500.  Salkeld's solo home run off future Hall of Famer Bob Feller in the sixth inning of Game 5 tied the contest at five; the following inning, Boston scored six runs to salt away an 11–5 victory (although Cleveland prevailed in the Series, four games to two). In 1949, he batted .255 in 66 games for Boston, with five home runs and 25 RBIs.

Salkeld played a single game for the Chicago White Sox in April 1950, then spent the remainder of the season with the Seattle Rainiers of the Pacific Coast League.

In six seasons, Salkeld batted .273 (232-for-850) with 111 runs, 31 home runs and 132 RBI. On August 4, 1945 he hit for the cycle.

Later years
After leaving baseball after the 1953 minor league season, Salkeld settled in the San Fernando Valley area of Los Angeles, where he had worked in the motion picture industry during off-seasons. He died from cancer at the age of 50 in 1967 and was buried at the Forest Lawn Cemetery in the Hollywood Hills area of Los Angeles. Four years later, his grandson Roger was born in Burbank, California.  Roger Salkeld would be chosen by the Seattle Mariners in the first round of the 1989 Major League Baseball Draft, and appear in 45 MLB games as a right-handed pitcher for the Mariners and Cincinnati Reds during the mid-1990s.

See also
 List of Major League Baseball players to hit for the cycle

References

Further reading

External links
, or Retrosheet
 

1917 births
1967 deaths
Baseball players from California
Baseball players from Idaho
Boston Braves players
Burials at Forest Lawn Memorial Park (Hollywood Hills)
Chicago White Sox players
Deaths from cancer in California
Indianapolis Indians players
Major League Baseball catchers
Pittsburgh Pirates players
Portland Beavers players
Sacramento Solons players
San Diego Padres (minor league) players
San Francisco Seals (baseball) players
Seattle Rainiers players
Sportspeople from Pocatello, Idaho
Stockton Ports players
Tucson Cowboys players